Alhaji Abubakar Habu Hashidu (10 April 1944 – 27 July 2018) was a Nigerian politician and former governor of Gombe State, Nigeria under the platform of All People's Party (APP) from May 1999 to May 2003.

Hashidu was the minister of Water Resources as well as a minister of Agriculture and Rural Development during the military regime of General Ibrahim Babangida. He was also a member of the Vision 2010 committee set up by General Sani Abacha to chart a developmental road-map for the country.

Hashidu was the first elected governor of Gombe State, Nigeria, taking office on 29 May 1999, on the platform of the All People's Party (APP).
His Deputy Governor was Joshua Lidani.

In January 2003 the All Nigeria Peoples Party endorsed Hashidu as its gubernatorial candidate for the April 2003 elections.
He failed to be re-elected and conceded with praise for the Independent National Electoral Commission.
He was again candidate for governor of Gombe State in 2007 on the DPP platform. He was arrested in March 2007 and put on trial over violence that allegedly broke out after he started his political campaign.
Armed supporters stormed the magistrate's court, freeing Hashidu and wounding the judge presiding over his case.

Hashidu died in his house in the early hours of 27 July 2018, after a protracted illness.

References

1944 births
2018 deaths
Governors of Gombe State
Nigerian Muslims
All People's Party (Nigeria) politicians
All Nigeria Peoples Party politicians
People from Gombe State